Dan or Daniel Robinson may refer to:

 Dan Robinson (American football) (1926–2022), American football coach
 Dan Robinson (runner) (born 1975), English long-distance runner
 Dan Robinson (footballer) (born 1994), Australian rules footballer for Sydney
 Dan Robinson (politician) (born 1926), Democratic member of the North Carolina Senate
 Dan Robinson (singer) (born 1947), Australian singer
 Daniel N. Robinson (1937–2018), American psychologist and philosopher
 Daniel Ruiz Robinson (born 1988), Mexican footballer 
 Daniel Robinson (Neighbours), a fictional character on Australian soap opera Neighbours
 Danny Robinson (born 1982), British football goalkeeper and coach
 Daniyal Robinson, American collegiate basketball coach

See also
 Daniel Webster Robinson House, Burlington, Vermont